NCAA Basketball All-Americans may refer to:

NCAA Men's Basketball All-Americans
NCAA Women's Basketball All-Americans